WLVM (98.3 FM) is an American radio station licensed to serve the community of Chickasaw, Alabama, and broadcasting to the Mobile metropolitan area. The station is owned by the Educational Media Foundation.

Programming
WLVM began broadcasting a Christian Contemporary music format branded as "K-LOVE" on July 15, 2012. The shift from the previous urban adult contemporary music format was a result of a multi-station deal that saw the programming formerly on WDLT-FM move to WABD (now WDLT-FM, 104.1 FM), the contemporary hit radio format on WABD moved to WLVM (now WABD, 97.5 FM), and the Christian programming on WLVM moved to WDLT-FM.

History
In 1980, this station was constructed with the assigned callsign WTUX. By the time it signed on, the call letters had been changed to WJQY and the station operated as "Joy-FM", a light music station. Initial license holder was the late broadcaster W.H. ("Bill") Phillips, who opened the station on a tiny patch of land annexed to the city of Chickasaw that actually was located in Mobile. Programmed by Detroit, Michigan, radio legend Bob Martin, it suffered from a low 3,000 watt signal. Even after beating crosstown rival, WLPR-FM, in its first ratings period, station ownership decided to switch to a new country music format and renamed the station "Q Country". This format faced tough local competition from market leader WKSJ-FM.

In January 1984, WJQY was sold by Phillips Radio Inc. to EJM Broadcasting, owned by New Orleans, Louisiana, broadcaster Ed Muniz. He had the call letters changed to WDLT on February 15, 1984, and switched the format to light rock. The staff was replaced and Bob Martin moving to WKSJ-FM (as personality Kelly Martin) and later shifted to WKRG-FM|WMXC (as Robert Gauge) with a short return to WOMC-FM in Detroit, Michigan.

In July 1986, EJM Broadcasting sold WDLT to JAB Broadcasting Co., owned by J. Alex Bowab. One year later, in July 1987, control of the station was transferred from JAB Broadcasting Co. to JAB Broadcasting Inc.

The station changed hands in July 1992 from JAB Broadcasting Inc. to United Broadcasting, Inc. The new owners adopted an Urban Adult Contemporary/Jazz format. In August 1993, a new transmitter and an authorization to increase ERP to 6,000 watts boosted coverage.

In May 1997 United Broadcasting reached an agreement to sell WDLT to April Broadcasting, Inc. The deal was approved by the FCC on July 8, 1997, and the transaction was consummated on October 31, 1997.

When AM sister station WHOZ changed its callsign to WDLT, the FM station was assigned the WDLT-FM call letters by the Federal Communications Commission on January 31, 1998. (That AM station changed callsigns again in 2007, first to WWFF then to the current WXQW.) In October 1999, control of WDLT-FM was transferred from M&F Associates L.P. to Cumulus Media, Inc.

On July 9, 2012, Cumulus Broadcasting announced that WLVM (97.5 FM) had been sold by the Educational Media Foundation to its holding company, Cumulus Licensing, LLC, as part of a multi-station deal. As a result, several format shifts were scheduled to take place simultaneously at noon on July 15, 2012. The urban AC format on WDLT-FM moved to WABD (now WDLT-FM, 104.1 FM), the CHR format on WABD moved to WLVM (now WABD, 97.5 FM), and the Christian programming on WLVM moved to WDLT-FM (now WLVM, 98.3 FM). The FCC accepted the WLVM license transfer application on July 10, 2012, and changed its call sign to WABD on July 16, 2012, but , had yet to approve the sale of the station. WABD and WDLT-FM are being operated under local marketing agreements until the sales are approved and the transactions consummated.

References

External links

LVM
K-Love radio stations
Contemporary Christian radio stations in the United States
Mobile County, Alabama
Radio stations established in 1982
1982 establishments in Alabama
Educational Media Foundation radio stations
LVM